28 September is International Safe Abortion Day. The day was first celebrated as a day of action for decriminalization of abortion in Latin America and the Caribbean in 1990 by the Campaña 28 Septiembre. In 2011, the Women's Global Network for Reproductive Rights (WGNRR) declared 28 September as an international day. The date was chosen to commemorate the passing of the Law of Free Birth passed by the Brazilian parliament on September 28, 1871. This law was a key legal reform intended to provide freedom for the children of enslaved people in Brazil at the time.

The day's name was changed to International Safe Abortion Day in 2015; that year 83 activities were organised in 47 countries by national, regional and international NGOs and activists. 2016 was the biggest International Safe Abortion Day ever celebrated.

In 2018, September 28 marked a mobilisation in Argentina against the cuts made to the Ministry of Health by the conservative government. These cuts had substantial impacts on women's welfare and access to abortions in the country.

In 2019, Malta held its first protest in favour of the legalisation of abortion; it was held on 28 September to commemorate International Safe Abortion Day.

In 2021, rallies across Latin America were held on International Safe Abortion Day in support of abortion rights. Thousands marched in protest in countries including El Salvador, Chile and Mexico to pressure lawmakers to ease punitive abortion laws.

References

External links
 La marea no baja 'The Tide Does Not Recede' – Página/12

Annual events in South America
Abortion in Central America